The subcontrabass saxophone is the largest of the family of saxophones that Adolphe Sax patented in 1846 and planned to build, but never constructed. Sax called this imagined instrument the saxophone bourdon, named after the very low-pitched 32′ bourdon pedal stop on large pipe organs. It is a transposing instrument pitched in B♭ one octave below the bass saxophone, two octaves below the tenor, and three octaves and a major second below its written pitch.

History
Although described in Adolphe Sax's patent in 1846, a practical, playable subcontrabass saxophone did not exist until the 21st century. An oversized saxophone that might have qualified was built as a prop circa 1965; it could produce tones, but its non-functional keywork required assistants to manually open and close the pads, and it was reportedly incapable of playing a simple scale.

The tubax was developed in two sizes in 1999 by German instrument manufacturer Benedikt Eppelsheim, the lower of which, pitched in B♭, he describes as a "subcontrabass saxophone". This instrument provides the same pitch range as the saxophone bourdon would have, while the smaller tubax in E♭ covers the range of the contrabass saxophone.
Whether or not the tubax is truly a saxophone is debated: it has the same fingering, but its bore, though conical, is narrower (relative to its length) than that of a regular saxophone.

The Brazilian instrument manufacturer J'Élle Stainer produced a working compact subcontrabass saxophone in 2010, which was shown that year at Expomusic.
In September 2012, Eppelsheim built the first full-size subcontrabass saxophone in B♭ (distinct from his B♭ tubax).
In July 2013, J'Élle Stainer completed a full-size subcontrabass saxophone.

See also
Tubax

References

External links
MP3 sound recording of the first movement of "Duet for Basses" by Walter Hartley, played as a B Tubax duet (one instrument, overdubbed), performed by Jay C. Easton

Saxophones
Contrabass instruments
B-flat instruments